Leopold van der Pals (St. Petersburg 4 July 1884 – Dornach 7 February 1966) was a Danish/Dutch modernist composer who developed a personal and lyrical style in composing by involving elements of late romanticism, expressionism and impressionism. 

From an early age, Van der Pals expressed himself as a composer, writing at least 50 works before the age of 18. He studied with Professor  Julius Johannsen (van der Pals grand father), Alexander Denéréas (Lausanne) and Reinhold Gliere (Berlin). Van der Pals also studied piano under Alexander Siloti and cello under Tom Canivez. 

Leopold van der Pals debut as a composer took place in 1909 with Berlin Philharmonic Orchestra (Symphony nr. 1 in F sharp minor, Op. 4) and an extensive tour of performances throughout Europe and America followed until WWII. The main part of his 252 works consists of music for singers (8 operas, 9 cantatas and 650 lieder), but it also includes orchestral works and chamber music. He was in close contact with authors, musicians, artists and poets his whole life. Among them were Rudolf Steiner, Andrei Belyj, Rainer Maria Rilke, Friedrich Lienhard, Sergei Rachmaninoff, Serge Koussevitzky and Alexander Scriabin.

Biography

St. Petersburg 1884-1903
Leopold van der Pals was born into an artistic and aristocratic home in St. Petersburg, Russian Empire with a Dutch father and Danish mother. His father, Hendrik van Gilse van der Pals was the Dutch general counsel in Russia and director of the “Treugolnik” rubber factory. 
At the age of 12, Leopold van der Pals started his musical training under his grandfather, Julius Johannsen, a Professor of counterpoint and director of the Saint Petersburg Conservatory (Johannsen was himself a student of Felix Mendelssohn and Niels W. Gade). The van der Pals home was open to artists and musicians, and here, Leopold van der Pals heard concerts with Modest Tchaikovsky, Anton Arensky, Alexander Glazunov, Alexander Siloti, Pablo Casals, and many others.

Lausanne 1903-1907
At the age of 19 van der Pals left Russia to continue his studies in Lausanne, Switzerland, with the famous Swiss composer and music theory professor Alexander Denéréas, and the cellist Thomas Canivez. Here he formed a long lasting friendship with the conductor Ernest Ansermet. Van der Pals' education was closely supervised by Denéréas, and even when van der Pals was forced to stay in a sanatorium in Davos to recover from signs of tuberculosis, Denéréas visited him and they continued their studies. 

In 1907, after four years of basic musical education in Lausanne, Van der Pals moved to Berlin and, on the recommendation of Sergei Rachmaninoff, he now received guidance and lessons by the Russian composer Reinhold Glière. Here, van der Pals formed a friendship with many musical personalities: Arthur Nikisch, Felix Weingartner, Siegmund von Hausegger, Gustav Havemann, Serge Koussevitsky and Alexander Scriabin among others. Here he also met the philosopher Rudolf Steiner, who made a great impression on him and introduced the idea of metamorphosis, derived from Johann Wolfgang von Goethe. At the time, Berlin was a melting pot of musical development in the wake of the romantic era. Van der Pals experimented with new harmonic ideas and alternative cadenzas. He shaped his personal expression, a hybrid of different styles such as romanticism, impressionism, free tonality and inspiration from Russian and Nordic folklore. It was here that he started to give his works opus numbers; all previous compositions were abandoned.

Berlin 1907-1915
During the Berlin years, 1907–1915, van der Pals was very productive and composed his first 30 works, concentrating on large orchestral pieces and lieder. His First Symphony, Op. 4 was premiered in 1909 by the Berlin Philharmonic Orchestra conducted by Heinrich Schulz. The Symphony was very well received in the press and this resulted in an extensive series of performances of his pieces throughout Europe and America.

Arlesheim 1915-1922
In 1915, due to World War I, Van der Pals moved to Arlesheim in Switzerland with his wife Marussja and their young daughter Lea. Here he started his large series of compositions of chamber music for various ensembles. A string quartet, a piano trio, a duo for cello and violin and sonatas for piano, cello and violin.

Years of traveling 1922-1934
In 1922 van der Pals completed his Second Symphony, Op. 51. However, the orchestration of this piece was interrupted when Leopold's wife Marussja fell ill; in order to treat her condition, the family was forced to leave Arlesheim. For a period of 11 years the family constantly traveled between sanatoriums in order to find a place suitable for Marussja's condition. During these years the family stayed in approximately 80 locations in Europe without a fixed home. This time was troublesome for Van der Pals. His wife's treatment was expensive and Leopold experienced great difficulty to follow and continue his career. He had no chance to travel and hear performances of his compositions. In spite of his difficulties he continued his work and in this period he composed the Third Symphony, "Rhapsody", Op. 73, the "Hodler Suite", Op. 74, based on four paintings by Ferdinand Hodler, and two operas, Der Berg des Heiligen Michael, Op. 71, and Eisenhand, Op. 85.

Dornach 1934-1966
Marussja died in 1934. Her death affected Leopold deeply. He withdrew himself to Ascona, Switzerland, and mourned the loss of his wife. Here Van der Pals wrote 80 poems to her love and memory; 45 of them were put to music. The work became his Op. 96, In Memoriam with the subtitle ”Dem Geiste meiner Frau". He then finally settled down in Dornach in Switzerland, where he lived during the remaining 31 years of his life.

In the early 1930s, Van der Pals experienced the loss of many people close to him: his wife, his father, and several of his close friends. During this period, he composed his Requiem and the Third violin sonata, Op. 101, with the middle movement ”Marcia funebre”. He also now orchestrated the Second Symphony, Op. 51. The premiere of the symphony took place in Vienna in 1937, with his brother Nicolaï van Gilse van der Pals conducting. At the same concert, his Third symphony and Violin Concerto were also played.

Even though the interest in van der Pals’ music was extensive, the possibilities of performances were soon to be diminished. The climate for modern composers and artists suffered from the harsh political atmosphere and escalating international conflicts. With the start of World War II all possibilities were gone and many artists migrated to America where the conditions were better. Leopold decided to stay in Switzerland even though this meant to distance himself from the modern music environment. He never stopped creating, no matter which obstacles came his way. Apart from the 252 completed opuses, he also wrote poems, articles, reviews and librettos for all of his eight operas. At the time of Leopold's death on 1 February 1966 aged 83, his last piece, an opera called Isis was left on the piano unfinished.

Family
Van der Pals married Maria (Marussja) von Beshe in St. Petersburg in 1907. They had one daughter, Lea van Gilse van der Pals, who became a famous dancer and teacher, both in Dornach, Switzerland and internationally. Leopold's brother, Nicolaï van Gilse van der Pals, was a conductor in Helsinki and elsewhere in Europe.

List of Works 
Leopold van der Pals wrote 252 opus, 43 Jugendwerke and a number of unfinished works. His oeuvre includes songs, chamber music, symphonies and eight operas.

Symphonic Works

 Symphony No. 1 in F sharp minor, Op. 4 (1909)
 Symphony No. 2, Op. 51 (1922; Orchestrated 1937)
 Symphony No. 3, “Rhapsodie”, Op. 73 (1927)
 Symphony No. 4 for String Orchestra, Op. 160 (1938)

 Spring and Autumn, Symphonic sketches, Op. 14
 Wieland the Blacksmith, (original title: "Wieland der Schmied") Symphonic Poem for large orchestra after Lienhard, Op. 23
 Pan's Death, (original title: "Pans Tod") Legend for large orchestra and mixed chorus ad. lib., Op. 24
 Hodler-Suite, Op. 74
 Uriel, Symphonic Poem for large orchestra, Op. 155
 Suite I. und II. aus der Musik zu «Mönch Wanderer» (LvP), Op. 84b

Works for chamber orchestra

 TIAOAIT, für Orchester Op. 29a
 Planetentanz, für Orchester, Op. 29b
 Musik zum «Märchen vom Quellenwunder», für Orchester, Op. 34a
 Musik zu «Orphische Urworte» (Goethe), Op. 39b
 Suite, für Streichorchester, Op. 90
 Trittico Ludovisiano, für Kammerorchester, Op. 102
 Zweite Phantasie für Orchester, Op. 179
 Musik zu «Luzifer und Ahriman»; Op. 245a

Opera

 Legende von der Prinzessin und dem gefesselten Jüngling (LvP) Op. 17
 Der Berg des Heiligen Michael (LvP),  Op. 71
 Eisenhand (LvP), Op. 85
 Michael (LvP), Oratorien-Oper in einem Aufzug, für Sopran (Tenor), Baß, Chor und Orchester, Op. 95
 Hero und Leander (LvP), Op. 137
 Der Schweinehirt (H. C. Andersen, LvP), Op. 140
 Apollo (LvP), Op. 158
 Medusa (LvP), Op. 215

Cantatas and Oratories

 Du brachtest uns nur Liebe, Güte und Frieden (LvP), JW
 Lieder und Chöre zu den Oberuferer Weihnachtsspielen, Op. 20
 Die zur Wahrheit wandern (Chr. Morgenstern), für gemischten Chor und Orchester, Op. 32
 Weihnacht (R. Steiner), Kantate für Sopran solo, Chor und Orchester, Op. 68
 Michael (LvP), Oratorien-Oper in einem Aufzug, für Sopran (Tenor), Baß, Chor und Orchester, Op. 95
 21 Japanische Utas, für Altstimme und Kammerorch. oder Klavier, Op. 119
 Anthroposophisches Requiem (R. Steiner), für Sopran solo, gemischten Chor, Streicher und Orgel oder Harmonium, Op. 200
 Vedische Hymne (U: H. Olivenberg), für Tenor solo, gemischten Chor und Orchester, Op. 232
 Preghiera (S. Francesco), für Tenor solo, gemischten Chor und Orchester,Op. 237

Choir a Capella

 Gebete an Maria, 10 Lieder für gemischten Chor a cappella, Op. 82 
 Zwei Weihnachtslieder, für gemischten Chor a cappella, Op. 109
 Michael-Feier (R. Steiner), für gemischten Chor a cappella, Op. 199

Lieder

 5 Lieder nach Japanischen Gedichten, Op. 1
 4 Lieder nach altgriechischen Liebesgedichten (Asklepiades, Meleagros), Op. 2
 3 Lieder (J. Milakowiá, Ü: Ed. Koller, Wang-Seng-Yu, Ü: C. Haussmann, M. Madeleine), Op. 3
 Die Hände mein (russisch, Ü: LvP), Op. 5
 Drei Gesänge (M. Geissler), Op. 6
 Drei Gesänge (H. Dupré), Op. 7
 Zwei Gesänge (A. Negri), Op. 8
 Lieder (0. J. Bierbaum), Op. 11
 La Muse d'Eleusis (E. Schuré) 2 Lieder, Op. 12
 Asali (J. P. Jakobsen, Ü: B. Federn) 3 Lieder, Op. 18
 3 Lieder (1: L. Gaj, Ü: E. Koller; 2,3: J.P. Jakobsen; Ü: E. Federn), Op. 21
 4 Lieder (Fr. Lienhard), Op. 22
 7 Lieder (W. Solowieff, Ü: LvP), Op. 25
 Es ist in dieser Sonnenstunde (R. Steiner), Op. 28a
 7 Lieder (Chr. Morgenstern), Op. 30
 4 Lieder (A. Belyj, Ü: LvP), Op. 31
 Geistliches Wiegenlied zu Weihnachten (VU), Op. 39/2
 Weihnachtsgesang, für Gesang und Klavier, Op. 44
 3 nächtliche Lieder (Goethe), Singstimme, Violoncello und Klavier, Op. 57
 7 Rennefeld-Lieder (0. Rennefeld), Op. 59
 24 Lieder (A. Steffen), Op. 62
 8 Lieder (J.P. Jacobsen, Ü: E. Federn), Op. 65
 21 Lieder (R. Steiner), Op. 67a
 6 Lieder (R. Steiner), Op. 67b
 2 Lieder (P. Bühler), Op. 72
 8 Madonnen-Lieder (LvP), erste Folge, Op. 76
 3 Weihnachtslieder (LvP), Op. 77
 5 Lieder (1: LvP, 2: C. F. Meyer, 3: Li-Tai-Po, 4: LvP, 5: M. Bauer), Op. 81
 6 Lieder (L. Kuckuck), Op. 83
 5 Madonnen-Lieder (LvP), zweite Folge, Op. 86
 Engelweben (H. von May), 7 Lieder, Op. 87
 Christus-Lieder (H. von May), 12 Lieder, Op. 88
 5 Madonnen-Lieder (LvP), dritte Folge, Op. 91
 5 Madonnen-Lieder (LvP), vierte Folge, Op. 92
 Fünf Gesänge (LvP), Op. 93
 9 Lieder des Herbstes (LvP), Op. 94
 In Memoriam,«Dem Geiste meiner Frau», 45 Lieder (LvP), Op. 96
 22 Lieder (Chr. Morgenstern), Op. 104
 5 Lieder (LvP), Op. 105
 10 Lieder des Sommers (LvP), Op. 106
 2 Lieder (A. Strindberg, U: E. Schering), Op. 110
 5 Lieder (E. A. Poe, U: Th. Etzel), Op. 111
 Lieder des Abends (R. M. Rilke), 9 Lieder, Op. 112
 Träumen (R. M. Rilke), 12 Lieder, Op. 113
 Venedig (R. M. Rilke), 4 Gondellieder, Op. 114
 Liebe (R. M. Rilke), 7 Lieder, Op. 115
 Der Tag entschlummert leise (R.M. Rilke), 18 Lieder, Op. 116
 6 Lieder (0. Fränkl), Op. 117
 21 Japanische Utas, für Altstimme und Kammerorch. oder Klavier, Op. 119
  Lieder (Li-Tai-Po), Op. 125
 3 geistliche Gesänge, Op. 127
 9 Lieder (M. Modena), Op. 129
 22 Lieder (E. Krell), Op. 130
 5 Lieder (P. Mac Kaye, U: A: Steffen), Op. 133
 Flötenlieder (chinesische Gedichte), 3 Lieder für Sopran, Flöte und Klavier, Op. 136
 6 Madonnen-Lieder (LvP), fünfte Folge, Op. 138
 Allerseelen (LvP), 3 Lieder, Op. 139
 9 Lieder (Fragmente von Sappho, U: B. Steiner), für Alt und Klavier, Op. 145
 5 Weihnachtslieder im Volkston («nach alten Gedichten»), für Alt und Streichquartett oder Klavier, Op. 148
 Marias Klagegesang am Kreuze Christi» (LvP), Op. 149
 24 Lieder (R. Waldstetter), Op. 150
 Bald (M. Beheim-Schwarzbach), Op. 151
 3 Marienlieder (lateinisches Kirchenlied; Novalis), Op. 152
 Zwei Lieder (indisch, U: 0. v. Glasenapp), Op. 156
 8 Lieder (A. Steffen), Op. 157
 7 Lieder des Sommers (LvP), Op. 161
 20 Lieder (Chr. Morgenstern), Op. 181
 6 Lieder (C. F. Meyer), Op. 187
 2 Lieder (W. Hauschka), Op. 188
 8 Lieder des Herbstes (LvP), Op. 196
 2 Lieder (LvP), Op. 197
 14 Geistliche Lieder (Novalis), Op. 198
 7 Lieder (alte geistliche Gedichte), Op. 210
 8 Lieder (neuere geistliche Gedichte von Herder, Seume, Kerner, Rückert, Mörike, C.F. Meyer, Dehmel, Mereskowskij), Op. 211
 2 Rosenlieder (P. Bühler), Op. 223
 Weihnachtsspruch (P. Bühler), Op. 223a
 Inka-Lied, Op. 224
 Die Goldene (Alt-ägyptische Gedichte, U: S. Schott), 4 Lieder, Op. 225
 2 Blumenlieder (P. Bühler), Op. 229
 6 Gesänge, nach modernen Negergedichten, Op. 229
 Eiland (E. Krell-Werth), 27 Lieder, Op. 233
 Zwillingsblume (E. Krell-Werth), 14 Lieder, Op. 234
 24 Lieder (Japanische Haiku), Op. 238
 Musik zum Puppenspiel «Die Wundergaben» (Gozzi), für Gesang und Streichquartett, Op. 97
 Musik zum Marionettenspiel «Hänsel und Gretel» (H. Proskauer), für Gesang, Flöte, Glockenspiel und Klavier, Op. 170
 Musik zu «Schneeweisschen und Rosenrot» (Grimm), für Gesang und Klavier, Op. 252

Piano

 Konzert, für Klavier und Orchester, Op. 100

 I Sonate, Op. 38
 II Sonate, “Kleine Sonate, für Klavier”, Op. 121
 III Sonate, Op. 143
 IV Sonate, Op. 227

 I Suite, “Miniatur-Tanzsuite”, für Klavier, Op. 118
 I Suite, “Bessenich-Suite”, für Klavier, Op. 123
 III Suite, für Klavier, Op. 227
 “Kaleidoskop”, Suite für Klavier, Op. 159

 Zwei Stimmungsbilder, Op. 9
 Stimmungen, 4 Stücke, Op. 15
 In Memoriam, Op. 16
 Präludium und Fuge, Op. 26
 5 kleine Präludien, für Klavier, Op. 45
 10 Stücke, für Klavier, Op. 70
 8 kleine Phantasiestücke, für Klavier, Op. 80
 Miniaturen, für Klavier erste Folge Klavierminiaturen, 4 Stücke, Op. 124
 3 Fugen, Op. 132
 Miniaturen, 4 Stücke für Klavier, zweite Folge, Op. 134
 33 Variationen und Fuge über S.B.B.-C.F.F, Op. 135
 12 kleine Stücke, Op. 177
 7 ganz kleine Klavierstücke, Op. 188/1
 Drei Musiken zu Feiern, Op. 204
 In Memoriam Dimitri von Laar-Larski, Op. 206
 Musik zu Jahresfesten, Op. 213
 Groteske, Op. 214
 Studien in Planetentonarten, 7 Stücke für Klavier, Op. 222
 2 Stücke, Op. 239
 7 kleine Klavierstücke, Op. 247
 Aphorismen, 25 kleine Klavierstücke, Op. 249

 Schneewittchen, Bühnenmusik für Klavier, Op. 28
 Auftakte zu Eurythmischen Darstellungen, für Klavier, Op. 29
 Romantischer Auftakt, für Klavier, Op. 35/1
 Eurythmie-Übungen, 28 musikalische Begleitmotive für Klavier, Op. 36
 Merkur-Auftakt, Fassung für Klavier, Op. 37b (Merkur-Auftakt, für Kammerensemble, Op. 37a)
 Musik zu «Melodie» (L. Jacobowski), Op. 39/1
 Auftakt zu «Elfenliedchen» (Goethe), für Klavier, Op. 40/1
 Musik zu «Frühling» (R. Steiner), für Klavier, Op. 40/2
 Musik zu «Butterblumengelbe Wiesen» (Chr. Morgenstern), Op. 40/3
 Musik zum «Märchen vom Quellenwunder», für Klavier, Op. 41
 Musik zu «Orphische Urworte» (Goethe), für Klavier, Op. 42
 Auftakt Achteck, für Klavier, Op. 47/1
 Musik zu «Wanderers Sturmlied» (Goethe), für Klavier, Op. 47/2
 Musik zu «Chor der Urträume» (F. von Steinwand), für Klavier vierhändig, Op. 49/1
 Musik zu «Das Verhängnis» (F. von Steinwand), für Klavier, Op. 49/2
 Musik zu «Lied des Ariel» (aus Shakespeares Sturm), für Klavier, Op. 50/1 
 Musik zu «Lied des Amiens» (aus Shakespeares Wie es euch gefällt), für Klavier, Op. 50/2
 Musik zu «Orpheus' Lied» (aus Shakespeares Heinrich VIII.), Op. 50/3
 Musik zu «Pack clouds away», für Klavier, Op. 50/4
 Musik zu einem Alt-Englischen Weihnachtsspiel (Anonymus), Op. 69
 Musik zu dem Legendenspiel «Mönch Wanderer», Op. 84a
 Musik zu «Overheard on a saltmarsh» (H. Monro), für Klavier, Op. 117a
 Musik zum Marionettenspiel «Rotkäppchen» (H. Proskauer); Op. 163
 Musik zu «Sea-farer» (alt-keltisch), für Klavier, Op. 167
 Musik zu «Lebenslied» (R. Hamerling), für Klavier, Op. 168
 7 Kompositionen für Eurythmie, für Klavier, Op. 169
 Musik zu «Thomas the Rhymer» (W. Scott), für Klavier, Op. 174
 Musik zum Märchen «Die Gänsemagd» (Grimm), Op. 180
 Musik zu «Das Wort wallt in der Welt» (R. Steiner), für Klavier, Op. 185a
 Musik zu «Herbst» (R. Steiner), für Klavier, Op. 185b
 Musik zu «Hirtenlied in der Weihnacht», für Klavier, Op. 191/2a
 Musik zu «Mignon» (Goethe), für Klavier, Op. 195
 Musik zu «Elfenlied» (Shakespeare), für Klavier, Op. 202
 Musik zu Sprüchen aus dem «Cherubinischen Wandersmann» (A. Silesius), für Klavier, Op. 201
 Musik zu «A,nour dérobant le miel» (Anakreon), für Klavier, Op. 205/1
 Musik zu Szenen aus «Der Hüter der Schwelle» (R. Steiner), Op. 207 (Nachspiel, aus op. 207, für Orchester, Op. 207a)
 Musik zu «Rotkäppchen» (Grimm), Op. 209
 Musik zu «Hymnus an die Freude» (Schiller), für Klavier, Op. 220
 Musik zu «Es plaudert der Bach» (M. Garff), für Klavier, Op. 226
 Flammenauftakt, für Klavier, Op. 230
 Musik zu «Die Huldigung der Künste» (Schiller), für Klavier, Op. 236a
 Musik zum Puppenspiel «Von der schönen und der lieben Puppe», Op. 242
 Musik zu «Luzifer und Ahriman» (R. Steiner), für Klavier, Op. 245

Violin

 Konzertstück, für Violine mit Orchesterbegleitung in h-Moll, Op. 10

 I Sonate für Violine und Klavier, Op. 58
 II Sonate für Violine und Klavier, Op. 63
 III Sonate, Duo für Violine und Klavier, Op. 101
 IV Sonate für Violine und Klavier, Op. 141
 V Sonate für Violine und Klavier, Op. 142
 VI Sonate für Violine und Klavier, Op. 221
 Solosonate für Violine, Op. 131

 Suite zur russischen Legende «Stern der Sterne» (A. Remisoff), für Violine und Klavier, Op. 120
 Suite, für Violine und Klavier, Op. 248

 Menuett, für Violine und Klavier, Op. 75/1
 Musik für Violine und Klavier, Op. 74/3
 3 Improvisationen, für Violine und Klavier, Op. 103
 In Memoriam Jan Stuten, für 2 Violinen und Klavier, Op. 173
 4 Stücke, für Violine und Klavier, Op. 178
 3 Stücke, für Violine und Klavier, Op. 178a
 Stück, für Violine und Orgel, Op. 183
 Zwei Stücke, für Violine und Klavier, Op. 190
 In Memoriam D.Armstrong, für Violine und Harmonium (Klavier), Op. 212
 2 Stücke, für Violine und Klavier, Op. 243

 Musik zu «Drei Seufzer» (A. Steffen), für Violine und Klavier, Op. 153a
 Musik zu «La Naissance de Merlin» (E. Schuré), Suite für Violine und Klavier, Op. 162
 Musik zu «Venedig» (Nietzsche), für Violine und Klavier, Op. 165
 Musik zu «Besiegung des Winters durch den Frühling» (I. Metaxa), für Violine und Klavier, Op. 172a
 Musik zu «Herbstgruß» (0. Fränkl), für Violine und Klavier, Op. 182/2a
 Musik zu «Soleils couchants» (V. Hugo), für Violine und Klavier, Op. 189
 Musik zu «Aan Rembrandt» (A. Verwey), für Violine und Klavier, Op. 216
 Musik zu «Nala und Damajanti» (indische Legende), für Violine, Violoncello, Glockenspiel und Klavier, Op. 236b

Viola

 Concertino, für Bratsche und Streichorchester, Op. 108
 Solosonate, Op. 146
 Musik zu «Die Geheimnisse» (Goethe), für Viola und Klavier, Op. 219

Cello

 I Sonate, d-Moll für Cello und Klavier, Op. 5a
 II Sonate, für Violoncello und Klavier, Op. 48
 Solosonate, Op. 64

 Suite, für Violoncello und Klavier, Op. 122

 Concertino, für Cello und Orchester, (adapted from the Concertino for Saxophone or Viola and Strings) Op. 108

 Elegie, Op. 27
 2 Stücke, für Violoncello und Klavier, Op. 53
 2 Stücke, für Violoncello und Klavier, Op. 240

Chambermusic for Strings

 Duo-Sonate, für Violine und Violoncello, Op. 55

 Drei Stücke, für verschiedene Instrumente, Op. 154
-Pezzo lirico op. 154/1, für Harfe und Violoncello
-Pezzo elegiaco op. 154/2, für Oboe und Bratsche
-Pezzo giocoso op. 154/3, für Flöte und Violoncello

 Pianotrio, Op. 56
 Musik für Violine, Violoncello und Klavier, Op. 75 Nr. 2
 Trio-Phantasie, Op. 192
 Vorspiel zur Eurythmie, für Violine, Violoncello und Klavier, Op. 235

 Stringtrio, Op. 107

 I Streichquartett, Op. 33
 II Streichquartett, Op. 66
 III Streichquartett, “Metamorphosen”, Op. 79
 IV Streichquartett, Op. 89
 V Streichquartett, auch “4 kleine Stücke für Streichorchester”, Op. 144
 VI Streichquartett, Op. 186
 In Memoriam Marie Steiner, Op. 176
 Musik zum Märchen «Schneeweisschen und Rosenrot», für Streichquartett und Klavier, Op. 171

 Musik zu «Die Erwartung» (Schiller), für Streichquartett oder Klavier, Op.166
 Musik zu «Pierrot lunaire» (Giraud, Ü: 0. E. Hartleben), für Oboe, Violine, Violoncello und Klavier, Op. 46
 Tijdloos Gelaat, 3 Stücke für Flöte, Violine, Violoncello und Klavier, Op. 203

Chambermusic for Winds

 Suite, für Klarinette und Klavier, Op. 248
 Stück, für Violine und Klarinette, Op. 246

 Präludium und Allegro, für Oboe und Klavier, Op. 99

 Quintett, für Flöte und Streichquartett, Op. 78
 Kleine Suite, für 2 Flöten und Klavier, Op. 60
 Musik, für Flöte und Klavier, Op. 75/3
 5 Stücke, für Flöte und Klavier, Op. 126
 Flötenlieder (chinesische Gedichte), 3 Lieder für Sopran,  Flöte und Klavier, Op. 136
 2 Stücke, für Flöte und Klavier, Op. 241
 4 kleine Stücke, für Flöte solo, Op. 250

 Vor- und Nachtakt zu «Wind und Geige» (Chr. Morgenstern), für Violine, Oboe und  Klavier, Op. 34b
 Intermezzo, für Ton-Eurythmie bzw. Flöte oder Geige und Klavier, Op. 35/2
 Musik zu «Pierrot lunaire» (Giraud, Ü: 0. E. Hartleben), für Oboe, Violine, Violoncello und Klavier, Op. 46
 Musik zu «Orpheus und Euridice», für 2 Flöten und 2 Violinen, Op. 98
 Musik zu «Jorinde und Joringel», für Flöte und Streichquartett, Op. 164
 Musik zu «Göttliche Komödie» (Dante), für Flöte und Harfe oder Klavier, Op. 191/1
 Musik zu «West-östlicher Divan» (Goethe), für Flöte und Harfe, Op. 194
 Musik zu «Lajeune Tarrentine» (A. Chenier), für Flöte, Violine und Klavier, Op. 205/2
 Musik zum Puppenspiel «Sommerrätsel», für Violine oder Flöte, Triangel, Glocken und Klavier, Op. 208
 Musik zu «Mondnacht auf dem Meere» (Li Oey), für Flöte, Glockenspiel und Klavier, Op. 217
 Musik zu «Die Schule des Silen» (C. F. Meyer), für Flöte und Klav., Op. 218
 Musik zu «Gartenpflege» (A. Steffen), für Flöte, Violine, Violoncello und Klavier oder Orgel, Op. 236c
 Musik zu «Hymnus aus Phaistos» (E: Schuré), für Flöte und Streichquartett, Op. 244
 Musik zu «Der Eintritt der Seele ins Jenseits» (E. Schurh), für Flöte und Streichquartett, Op. 244a

Harp

 Sonate, für Harfe solo, Op. 147
 Musik zu «Göttliche Komödie» (Dante), für Flöte und Harfe oder Klavier, Op. 191/1
 Musik zu «West-östlicher Divan» (Goethe), für Flöte und Harfe, Op. 194

Organ

 Präludium, für Orgel, Op. 43
 Pièce pour Violon et Orgue, Op. 183

Recordings
 Leopold van der Pals, Works for Cello and Piano • Tobias van der Pals, cello • Cathrine Penderup, piano Polyhymnia Forlag © Gateway Music · SOUNDCLOUD
 Leopold van der Pals, Sonata, Duo, Trio & 3 Fugues • Elisabeth Zeuthen Schneider, violin • Tobias van der Pals, cello • Kristoffer Hyldig, piano Polyhymnia Forlag © Gateway Music · SOUNDCLOUD ”5 Records of the Year, 2016" Awarded by Scott Noriega, Fanfare Magazine "Want List”
 Leopold van der Pals, Symphony No.1 op in F sharp minor ”Fruling und Herbst” ,op 14. ”Wieland der Schmied”, op 23 Helsingborg Symphony Orchestra, Sweden. Conductor Johannes Goritzki. Recorded by CPO, Germany.

Literature
 ”Leopold van der Pals. Komponieren fur eine neue Kunst”. Dr Wolfram Graf. PhD thesis, 
"Unter dem Zeichen des Rosenkreuzes. Leopold van der Pals' esoterische Schülerschaft bei Rudolf Steiner", 
 ”Anthroposopfy im 20. Jahrhunder”. ”Ein Kulturimpuls in Biografischen Porträts” Bodo von Plato (Hg.), "
 "Compositori europei in pagine vocali o corali agli esordi del XX secolo: Carlevarini, L. Manenti E. Dagnino, Antonio ed Alfredo Cece, Alfredo Macchitella, Giuseppe Giacomantonio, Carlevarini, C.De Rosa, H. J. Pestalozzi, L. Tosi, Gilse Van Der Pals"; Dr Mario-Giuseppe Genesi in: "Archivio Storico Lodigiano", "Società Storica Lodigiana" Lodi (I), 2021,year CXL.

References

 Biography of Leopold van Gilse van der Pals (Accessed 24 October 2009).
 Leopold van der Pals website
https://www.polyhymniaforlag.com/
 
http://www.leopold.vanderpals.com/
https://www.goetheanum.org/fileadmin/vk/2016/10_Kurzt/Pals_Flyer.pdf
 https://www.anthroposophie.ch/uploads/media/van_der_Pals_Leopold.pdf
https://anthrowiki.at/Leopold_van_der_Pals
http://www.tobiasvanderpals.com/
http://goritzki.com/en/leopold-van-der-pals/
https://www.youtube.com/watch?v=mi_3CNt5FY4
https://www.youtube.com/watch?v=8MsplBDWKlM
https://www.dkdm.dk/Kunst-og-udvikling/Udgivelser/CDer/Leopold-van-der-Pals

Dutch composers
1884 births
1966 deaths
Musicians from Saint Petersburg
Emigrants from the Russian Empire to Switzerland